Glyptothorax callopterus is a species of catfish that was first described by Smith, 1945. Glyptothorax callopterus is a species in genus Glyptothorax, family Sisoridae and order Siluriformes. IUCN categorise the species as least concern globally. No subspecies are listed in Catalogue of Life.

References 

Glyptothorax
Fish described in 1945
Taxobox binomials not recognized by IUCN